The Oppo Neo 3 is the second phone in Oppo's Neo Series. It went on sale for an initial pricing of ₹8577 in India in August 2014.

References 

Neo 3
Mobile phones introduced in 2014
Android (operating system) devices
Discontinued smartphones
Mobile phones with user-replaceable battery